A rubber band is a length of rubber and latex formed in a loop. 

Rubber band or rubberband may also refer to:

RubberBand, Cantopop band
"Rubber Band" (song), a 1966 single by David Bowie
"Rubberbandman" (song), a 1991 song by Yello
"The Rubber Band", 1936 Nero Wolfe novel by Rex Stout
"Rubber Band", a 1970s disco hit by The Trammps
Bootsy's Rubber Band, a P-Funk spinoff group formed in 1976 and led by Bootsy Collins
Rubber band, a technique to balance the difficulty of a video game
Rubberband (Charlie Worsham album), released in 2013
Rubberband (Miles Davis album), released in 2019
Rubber Band (TV series), a Pakistani television series
"Rubber Bands", a song by the Fire Theft from their self-titled album